Merrily We Roll Along is a 1981 American musical with music and lyrics by Stephen Sondheim and a book by George Furth. It is based on the 1934 play of the same name by George S. Kaufman and Moss Hart.

Merrily premiered on Broadway on November 16, 1981, in a production directed by frequent Sondheim collaborator Hal Prince, with a cast almost exclusively of teenagers and young adults. The show was not the success the previous Sondheim–Prince collaborations had been: after a chaotic series of preview performances, it opened to widely negative reviews, and closed after 16 performances and 52 previews.

In the years since, the show has been extensively rewritten and has enjoyed several notable productions, including an off-Broadway revival in 1994, and a London premiere in 2000 that won the Laurence Olivier Award for Best New Musical.

The show will have its first Broadway revival in fall 2023, directed by Maria Friedman, which will be a transfer of the 2022 off-Broadway production staged at New York Theatre Workshop.

Premise
The show tells the story of how three friends' lives and friendship change over 20 years; it focuses particularly on Franklin Shepard, a talented composer of musicals who, over those 20 years, abandons his friends and songwriting career to become a producer of Hollywood movies. Like the play on which it is based, the show's story moves backward in time. It begins in 1976 at the friends' lowest moment and ends in 1957, at their youthful best.

Background and original production
The idea for Merrily originated from a suggestion by Hal Prince's wife, Judy, that he do a show about teenagers; he decided that a musical version of the 1934 George S. Kaufman/Moss Hart play Merrily We Roll Along would be a good fit, and when he called Sondheim about the idea, Sondheim "said yes on the phone."

The original play tells the story of "Richard Niles, who is revealed on the opening night of his latest play [in 1934] to be a pretentious playwright of successful but forgettable light comedies", and over the course of the play, gradually moves backward in time until reaching "his college graduation [in 1916], quoting with all the fervor of idealistic youth the words of Polonius: 'This above all, to thine own self be true'." The play concerned, overall, "three friends, their artistic ambitions, the price of fame, and the changes in American society from World War I to the Depression".

For the musical adaptation, the story was revised to take place between 1955 and 1980, and the characters were changed: "Richard Niles", a playwright, was now Franklin Shepard, a composer; "Jonathan Crale", a painter, was now Charley Kringas, a lyricist and playwright; and "Julia Glenn", a novelist, was now Mary Flynn, a journalist and eventually a critic.

George Furth was brought on to write the musical's book, making Merrily a reunion for Sondheim, Furth, and Prince, who had all worked together on the landmark 1970 musical Company. Merrily premiered at the Alvin Theatre on Broadway, where Company had premiered.

As part of the original idea of doing a show about teenagers, and in order to, as theater historian Ken Mandelbaum put it, "enhance the ironies of the story", Prince cast the show entirely with teenagers and young adults, who played their characters in both youth and middle age. Prince and Sondheim had conceived of the show as "a vehicle for young performers", and Prince was also charmed by, as he said at the time, "the beginnings of [the cast's] artistry, the roughness of their craft, their inexperience. I was charmed as hell by that[.]"

The show's production design was also informed by this notion: the set consisted of a group of movable bleachers lined with lockers and a screen on which projections were shown "to set the mood and period." Prince's original idea for the staging had been to "have no scenery", but rather "racks of clothes and these kids would come in looking like little kids, and they would pretend to be their parents as they see them", but this was discarded due to Prince's perception of what Broadway audiences, paying Broadway prices, would accept from a show (as he later put it, "[G]uess what? I lacked the courage.")

Sondheim's score was a mix of the traditional and the unconventional. In basic form and sound, the songs were written in the style of traditional Broadway show music of the 1950's (where Merrily's story "began") and earlier, a clear departure from the musical complexity of his previous work. But the score was also written to embody the show's backward structure in its use and repetition of certain sections of music. For example, "Not a Day Goes By" is first heard in its "reprise", sung bitterly by Frank's wife Beth after their divorce, before being heard in its "original" form late in the second act, sung by Frank and Beth as they get married. Additionally, "Good Thing Going" is gradually deconstructed throughout the musical before reaching its final—but "initial"—form near the end of the show, as "Who Wants to Live in New York?" This technique was at times used, Sondheim said, to show how "the songs that had been important in the lives of the characters when they were younger would have different resonances as they aged"; he also used some of these musical repetitions to represent "undercurrents of memory" in the characters in their later years. Because of the strictures Sondheim applied to his writing, Merrily's score was one of the most difficult of his career to write.

For budgetary reasons, Merrily did not get an out-of-town tryout production, and instead the production put on over 50 tryout performances—which were actually previews—on Broadway before the opening. The tryouts, beginning on October 8, 1981, had a poor reception, with audiences walking out. By October 21, The New York Times reported that original leading man James Weissenbach had been replaced by Jim Walton and the Broadway opening had been postponed. Field was replaced with choreographer Larry Fuller. The opening was delayed a second time, from November 9 to November 16, 1981. Looking back on that "painful month", Sondheim recalled, "that month of fervent hysterical activity was the most fun I've ever had on a single show." By opening night, the production team "thought we'd fixed the show," but in retrospect, they had only "bettered it, not fixed it," and the critical response was "merciless."

The Broadway production, directed by Prince and choreographed by Fuller, opened on November 16, 1981, at the Alvin Theatre. It received mostly negative reviews. While the score was widely praised, critics and audiences alike felt that the book was problematic and the themes left a sour taste in their mouths. Hampered by several critical reviews published before its official opening, as well as more negative ones published afterward, it ran for 16 performances and 52 previews.

In his New York Times review, Frank Rich wrote, "As we all should probably have learned by now, to be a Stephen Sondheim fan is to have one's heart broken at regular intervals." Clive Barnes wrote, "Whatever you may have heard about it—go and see it for yourselves. It is far too good a musical to be judged by those twin kangaroo courts of word of mouth and critical consensus."

The cast included Jim Walton (Franklin Shepard), Lonny Price (Charley Kringas), Ann Morrison (Mary), Terry Finn (Gussie), Jason Alexander (Joe), Sally Klein (Beth), Geoffrey Horne (Franklin Shepard age 43), David Loud (Ted), Daisy Prince (Meg), Liz Callaway (Nightclub Waitress), Tonya Pinkins (Gwen), Abby Pogrebin (Evelyn), and Giancarlo Esposito (valedictorian). Judith Dolan designed costumes for the production.

The audience had trouble following the story. Consequently, the actors all ended up wearing sweatshirts with their characters' names. According to Meryle Secrest, "Prince ... dressed everyone in identical sweatshirts and pants. Then he had to add names emblazoned across the sweatshirts because the audience had difficulty telling the actors apart". Sondheim later remembered: "I rather liked it; the paying audience did not." The failure of Merrily meant the "glory days" of the Sondheim-Prince collaboration were over, and the two did not work together again until Bounce (2003).

Subsequent production history
Throughout the years, with Furth's and Sondheim's permission, the musical has been staged with numerous changes. Sondheim has contributed new songs to several of the show's incarnations, most notably "Growing Up", added to the La Jolla 1985 production.

Off-Broadway
A "streamlined" off-Broadway revival, directed by Susan H. Schulman, opened on May 26, 1994, at the York Theatre in St. Peter's Church, and ran for 54 performances. The cast included Malcolm Gets as Franklin, Adam Heller as Charley, and Amy Ryder as Mary. A cast recording was released by Varèse Sarabande.

Another off-Broadway revival, directed by Noah Brody with choreography by Lorin Latarro, began on January 12, 2019, opening February 19 and originally set to run to April 7, 2019 (extended to April 14, 2019), by Roundabout Theatre's resident company, Fiasco Theater, at the Laura Pels Theater. The reduced cast included Manu Narayan, Brittany Bradford, Jessie Austrian, Ben Steinfeld, Paul L. Coffey, and Emily Young.

San Diego and Washington D.C.
A production directed by James Lapine opened on June 16, 1985, at San Diego's La Jolla Playhouse, where it ran for 24 performances. The cast included John Rubinstein as Frank, Chip Zien as Charley, Marin Mazzie as Beth, and Heather MacRae as Mary.

An Arena Stage production, directed by Douglas C. Wager and choreographed by Marcia Milgrom Dodge, opened on January 30, 1990, at Washington, D.C.'s Kreeger Theater, where it ran slightly more than two months. The cast included Victor Garber, David Garrison, Becky Ann Baker and, as in San Diego, Marin Mazzie as Beth. In his review of the production, Rich wrote, "Many of the major flaws of the 1981 Merrily, starting with its notorious gymnasium setting, have long since been jettisoned or rectified in intervening versions produced in La Jolla, Calif., and in Seattle." He called the score "exceptional."

A 2007 Signature Theatre production also ran in Arlington, Virginia.

United Kingdom

The UK premiere of Merrily We Roll Along was at the Guildhall School of Music and Drama on May 11, 1983. The first professional production in the UK was by the Library Theatre Company in Manchester in 1984, directed by Howard Lloyd Lewis and choreographed by Paul Kerryson.

Paul Kerryson directed a production of the show at the Haymarket Theatre, Leicester with orchestrations by Jonathan Tunick and music direction by Julian Kelly. The production opened on 14 April 1992 with a cast that included Michael Cantwell as Frank, Maria Friedman as Mary and Evan Pappas as Charlie. A cast recording of the production was released in 1994 which included extended cuts and dialogue. The show finally received its West End premiere at London's Donmar Warehouse on 11 December 2000 in a production directed by Michael Grandage, running for 71 performances following eight previews. The cast was led by Julian Ovenden as Frank, Samantha Spiro as Mary and Daniel Evans as Charley. Spiro and Evans received Olivier Awards for their performances, and the production received the Olivier for Best Musical.

Karen Hebden's production for Derby Playhouse in May 2007 featured Glyn Kerslake as Frank, Glenn Carter as Charley, Eliza Lumley as Mary, and Cheryl McAvoy as Beth.

Maria Friedman directed a revival of the musical at London's Menier Chocolate Factory, which opened on 28 November 2012 and transferred to the Harold Pinter Theatre in the West End on 1 May 2013. The principals in this production were Mark Umbers, Jenna Russell and Damian Humbley. The revival won the Peter Hepple Award for Best Musical in the 2012 Critics' Circle Theatre Awards. It was filmed and broadcast to select cinemas in 2013.

Reunion concert
The original Broadway cast reunited to stage a concert version of the show for one night on September 30, 2002, with both Sondheim and Prince in attendance.

Encores!
The Encores! staged concert at New York City Center ran from February 8 to 19, 2012. This production was directed by James Lapine and featured Colin Donnell as Frank, Celia Keenan-Bolger as Mary, Lin-Manuel Miranda as Charley, Elizabeth Stanley as Gussie, and Betsy Wolfe as Beth. This version incorporated parts of revisions done for the 1985 La Jolla Playhouse production and 1990 and 1994 productions. Many members of the original production were invited to attend on February 14 and joined the Encores! cast and Sondheim on stage following the performance to sing "Old Friends."

2022 Off-Broadway revival / 2023 Broadway revival
A new revival, directed by Maria Friedman, based on her previous staging at the Menier Chocolate Factory, was staged at New York Theatre Workshop from November 21, 2022, to January 22, 2023. It starred Jonathan Groff as Franklin, Lindsay Mendez as Mary, and Daniel Radcliffe as Charley. The production will transfer to the Hudson Theatre on Broadway in September 2023 for a limited 18-week engagement, with Groff, Mendez, Radcliffe, Krystal Joy Brown (Gussie), Katie Rose Clarke (Beth) and Reg Rogers (Joe) reprising their roles. This will be the first time that Merrily We Roll Along has been staged on Broadway since its original 1981 production.

Other major productions
The first Australian professional production was presented by the Sydney Theatre Company at the Footbridge Theatre in May–July 1996. It featured Tom Burlinson, Tony Sheldon, Peta Toppano, Greg Stone and Gina Riley, and was directed by Wayne Harrison.

In 2002, the show ran for approximately 120 performances at the Shaw Festival in a production directed by Jackie Maxwell and featuring Tyley Ross as Franklin, Jay Turvey as Charley and Jenny L. Wright as Mary.

As part of the Sondheim Celebration at the Kennedy Center, a limited engagement of 14 performances opened on July 12, 2002 at the Eisenhower Theater. The cast featured Michael Hayden (Frank), Miriam Shor (Mary), Raúl Esparza (Charley), and Emily Skinner (Gussie).

A Derby Playhouse production ran from April 19 to May 19, 2007, starring Glyn Kerslake, Glenn Carter and Eliza Lumley in the lead roles. A Signature Theatre (Arlington, Virginia) production, directed by Eric D. Schaeffer, opened on September 4, 2007 and ran through October 14, 2007. The production received four Helen Hayes Award nominations, with a win for Erik Liberman as Charley. John Doyle directed a production running at the Watermill Theatre, Newbury, Berkshire, from January 16, 2008 through March 8, 2008. It featured Sam Kenyon (Frank), Rebecca Jackson (Gussie), Elizabeth Marsh (Mary) and Thomas Padden (Charley).

Available Light Theatre (AVLT) presented the revised version at the Vern Riffe Center in Columbus, Ohio, from August 19, 2010 through September 4, 2010. It was directed by John Dranschak and featured Ian Short as Frank, Nick Lingnofski as Charley, and Heather Carvel as Mary. The musical director was Pam Welsh-Huggins. The Cincinnati Playhouse in the Park presented a revival directed by John Doyle, using the actor-musician concept, opening on March 3, 2012. The cast included Malcolm Gets (Frank), Daniel Jenkins (Charley), and Becky Ann Baker (Mary). This production used the 1994 York Theatre revisions.

Clwyd Theatr Cymru at Mold in North Wales performed the musical May 12 – June 2, 2012, directed by Nikolai Foster. PAN Productions staged Merrily We Roll Along in 2014 at the Kuala Lumpur Performing Arts Centre for the first time in South East Asia. Directed by Nell Ng with music direction by Nish Tham. This production featured Peter Ong (Frank), Aaron Teoh (Charley), Chang Fang Chyi (Mary), Nikki Palikat (Gussie), Stephanie Van Driesen (Beth), and Dennis Yeap (Joe).

Astoria Performing Arts Center produced an off-off-Broadway production in 2015 starring Jack Mosbacher as Frank, Ally Bonino as Mary, and Nicholas Park as Charley. The production won Outstanding Production of a Musical at the 2015 New York Innovative Theatre Awards.

The Wallis Annenberg Center for The Performing Arts in Beverly Hills staged a production from November 23 to December 18, 2016. Directed by Michael Arden, the production starred Aaron Lazar as Frank, Wayne Brady as Charley, and Donna Vivino as Mary.

The Huntington Theatre Company produced Maria Friedman's version in Boston, running from September 8 to October 15, 2017. Umbers and Humbley reprised their roles from the London production, with Eden Espinosa joining as Mary. This production won the 2012 Critics' Circle Theater Award.

The Hayes Theatre in Sydney staged a production directed by Dean Bryant which was intended to start its run on 16 April 2020, but was delayed by the COVID pandemic. The production finally premiered on 21 October 2021, with an expected run to 27 November. The production was well-reviewed, and extended its run to 9 December.

Principal casts

Synopsis
This is a synopsis of the revised 1994 York Theatre version of the show, not the original one performed on Broadway.

Act I
Franklin Shepard is a rich, famous, and influential songwriter and film producer ("Merrily We Roll Along"). As the years roll back over 20 years of his life, we see how he went from penniless composer to wealthy producer, and what he gave up to get there.

In Frank's swank Los Angeles pad in 1976, after the premiere of his latest film, a party is in full swing. Frank's Hollywood peers are there, and bestow lavish praise on him ("That Frank"). His oldest friend, theatre critic Mary Flynn, is also at the party. She is disgusted by the shallow people Frank has chosen to associate with and by his abandonment of music—the one thing he was truly good at—for commercial film production. Frank seems happy, but tenses up when a guest mentions a Pulitzer-winning play by Charles Kringas, Frank's former best friend and lyricist. Frank and Mary get a moment alone together, and she chides him for missing his son's graduation. Frank admits to Mary that his new film is just a formula picture, but promises: just wait for the next film! But Mary has given up waiting, and becomes more and more inebriated. She gives a drunken toast, castigating Frank and insulting his guests, and storms out of the party (and Frank's life) in a drunken rage.

Frank's wife Gussie arrives and they start to argue. She is angry that the leading role in Frank's movie, which she had planned to star in, went to a younger actress, Meg. Stung by Mary's rant, Frank confesses that he has concentrated so completely on being a "success" that everything and everyone he most valued at the beginning of his career has gone. The evening ends traumatically when Gussie confronts Frank with knowledge of his infidelity with Meg, the leading actress in his movie. He ends their marriage, and she viciously attacks Meg by splashing iodine in her eyes.

The years roll back to 1973 ("Merrily We Roll Along – First Transition"). Frank and Charley are about to be interviewed in a New York TV studio. Mary greets Charley backstage, and Charley tells her that Frank never has time to write with him anymore. Mary, whose drinking is steadily worsening, confesses that she set up the interview to force Frank to publicly commit to writing the show he and Charley have been trying to write for years, but Charley is frustrated and bitter. Mary wonders plaintively why can't their collective friendship be "like it was" ("Old Friends (Part I) – Like It Was"), and Charley realizes that Mary, after 20 years, is still in love with Frank. When Frank finally arrives, his new wife Gussie in tow, tensions are running high. Gussie is trying to avoid her ex-husband, Broadway producer Joe Josephson, who is hitting her up for money, and Frank is fretting over how to tell Charley that he has signed a three-picture deal. Just before the interview, the host lets the news slip, infuriating Charley. As they go live on air, an increasingly angry and nervous Charley launches into a furious rant on the way his composer has transformed himself into "Franklin Shepard Inc.", pleading with Frank to return to doing what he does best. After the cameras are shut off, Charley is remorseful, but the damage is done. Frank disowns Charley and walks out. Their friendship is over.

It's 1968, and Mary, Charley and Frank are in Frank's new apartment on Central Park West ("Merrily We Roll Along – Second Transition"), welcoming Frank back from a cruise. Charley has brought along Frank's young son, Frankie, whom he has not seen since his divorce. Frank has brought a gift for each of his friends: a copy of Mary's best-selling novel in Spanish and a contract for a film option on his and Charley's show, Musical Husbands. Charley refuses, and an argument is sparked. Frank wants to option the film version for the money, which he needs after a contentious divorce, but Charley says it will get in the way of writing anything new. Mary calms them down, reminding them about the importance of their friendship ("Old Friends"), but it is clear that nothing is that simple anymore. Frank's producer Joe and his wife Gussie arrive. Gussie has brought champagne, which the teetotaler Mary refuses. It becomes clear that Frank and Gussie are having an affair, and Charley, Mary, and Joe are all aware of it. Mary, who has been in love with Frank for years, is devastated by his irresponsibility and takes a generous gulp of champagne to prove a point. When everyone leaves, Charley lingers and advises Frank to end the affair, encouraging him to join him and Mary for a get-together at the club where they got their start. After he leaves, Frank plays through an old song and attempts to make sense of his choices. He seems to be on the verge of composing a new piece but is interrupted when Gussie returns, announcing that she intends to live with him and divorce Joe ("Growing Up").

In 1966 ("Merrily We Roll Along – Third Transition"), Frank is being divorced by his wife Beth, and they fight over custody of their son in a courthouse. Reporters flock around, eager to catch gossip since Gussie has been subpoenaed. Frank confronts Beth, who confesses that she still loves him, but that she can't live with him knowing he was unfaithful to her with Gussie ("Not a Day Goes By"). She drags their son away, heading to Houston to live with her father. Frank collapses in despair but is consoled by Mary, Charley, and his other remaining friends. They convince him to take a cruise, forget and start anew, saying that this was the "best thing that ever could have happened" ("Now You Know").

Act II
In 1964, Gussie appears to be singing about Frank's infatuation with her, but the scene transforms, and we see that she is performing the song onstage, as the star of Musical Husbands, on the opening night of Frank and Charley's first Broadway show. The curtain comes down on the show, and as the audience applauds, Charley and Frank, backstage with Joe, Mary, and Beth, realize they have a hit on their hands ("It's a Hit!"). Charley's wife, Evelyn, is in labor, and he and Beth rush to the hospital. Mary asks Beth to stay behind and make sure Frank is not left alone with Gussie, but Beth chooses to trust her husband and leaves Frank on his own, listening to the sound of the audience applauding.

In 1962 ("Merrily We Roll Along – Fourth Transition"), Frank, Beth, Charley, and Mary have been invited to a party at Gussie and Joe's elegant Sutton Place apartment, where they stand starstruck by the glamor and the influential crowd ("The Blob"). Deliberately spilling wine on Beth's dress, Gussie pulls Frank away from the partygoers, confiding her unhappiness to him, and convinces him to write the commercial show Joe is producing, Musical Husbands, rather than the political satire he and Charley are trying to get produced ("Growing Up" (Reprise)). Returning to her guests, she invites the songwriters to perform their latest song, "Good Thing Going". The guests love it and Gussie implores them to do an encore. Charley urges Frank not to, but Frank agrees. They play the song again, but the guests quickly lose interest and resume their noisy cocktail chatter ("The Blob" (Reprise)). Charley storms out as Mary looks on worriedly.

Time turns back to 1960 ("Merrily We Roll Along – Fifth Transition"). Charley, Frank, and Beth are performing at a small nightclub in Greenwich Village, with a supportive Mary lending a hand. Trying to appear bright and sophisticated, they perform a song celebrating America's new First Family ("Bobby and Jackie and Jack"). Joe is in the tiny audience and is quite impressed, as is his new fiancée (and former secretary) Gussie. After the show, Frank explains to them that he and Beth are marrying. It becomes clear that the wedding is due to her pregnancy, but Frank professes his happiness anyway. With Mary, Charley, and Beth's disapproving parents looking on, the happy couple exchanges vows as a lovelorn Mary tries to swallow her feelings for Frank ("Not a Day Goes By" (Reprise)).

In 1959 ("Merrily We Roll Along – Sixth Transition"), Frank, Charley, and Mary are busy in New York, working their way up the career ladder ("Opening Doors"), taking any job they can and working feverishly on their songs, plays, and novels. (Sondheim said this is the "only autobiographical song [he's] ever written... It's about all of us [writers] in the 50s knocking on the doors of producers and trying to get heard.") The men audition for Joe, but he wants more "hummable" tunes, and instructs them to leave their name with his secretary. So they decide to do their own show and, in an ensuing montage, audition and hire Beth and form a cabaret show together.

Finally, it is October 1957 ("Merrily We Roll Along – Seventh Transition"). Early in the morning, Frank and Charley are on the roof of an apartment building on New York City's 110th Street, waiting to see the first-ever earth-orbiting satellite. Frank, who is about to be released from the Army, tells Charley how much he likes Charley's plays and proposes that they turn one, a political satire, into a musical. Mary, their neighbor, arrives to view the satellite, and meets the boys for the first time. She has heard Frank's piano from her apartment, and tells him how much she admires his music. He speaks of how much composing means to him. Suddenly, Sputnik is there in the sky, and now, for the young friends, anything is possible ("Our Time").

Musical numbers
The original 1981 Broadway production

Act I

 "The Hills of Tomorrow" – Company
 "Merrily We Roll Along" – Company
 "Rich and Happy" – Franklin Shepard and Guests
 "Merrily We Roll Along" – Company
 "Old Friends" - Mary, Charley
 "Like It Was" – Mary
 "Franklin Shepard, Inc." – Charley Kringas
 "Merrily We Roll Along," (Reprise) – Company
 "Old Friends" (Reprise) – Franklin, Charley and Mary
 "Merrily We Roll Along" (Reprise) – Company
 "Not a Day Goes By" – Beth
 "Now You Know" – Mary and Company

Act II
 "It's a Hit!" – Franklin, Mary, Charley and Joe
 "Merrily We Roll Along" (Reprise) – Company
 "Good Thing Going" – Charley and Franklin
 "Merrily We Roll Along" (Reprise) – Company
 "Bobby and Jackie and Jack" – Charley, Beth, Franklin and Ted
 "Not a Day Goes By" (Reprise) – Franklin and Mary
 "Opening Doors" – Franklin, Charley, Mary, Joe and Beth
 "Our Time" – Franklin, Charley, Mary and Company
 "The Hills of Tomorrow" (Reprise) – Company

1994 Off-Broadway revival
From the 1994 Off-Broadway revival at York Theatre, which has remained the produced version since:

Act I
 Overture – Orchestra
 "Merrily We Roll Along" – Company
 "That Frank" – Franklin Shepard, Mary Flynn and Guests
 "First Transition" – Company
 "Old Friends" (Part I) – Mary and Charley Kringas
 "Like It Was" – Mary
 "Franklin Shepard, Inc." – Charley
 "Second Transition" – Company
 "Old Friends" (Part II) – Mary, Franklin and Charley
 "Growing Up" – Franklin and Gussie
 "Third Transition" – Company
 "Not a Day Goes By" – Beth
 "Now You Know" – Mary and Company

Act II
 Entr'acte – Orchestra
 "Act Two Opening" – Gussie
 "It's a Hit" – Franklin, Charley, Mary, Joe and Beth
 "Fourth Transition" – Company
 "The Blob" – Gussie and Company
 "Growing Up" (Part II) – Gussie
 "Good Thing Going" – Charley
 "The Blob" (Part II) – Company
 "Fifth Transition" – Company
 "Bobby and Jackie and Jack" – Charley, Beth, Franklin and Pianist
 "Not a Day Goes By" (Reprise) – Beth, Franklin and Mary
 "Sixth Transition" – Company
 "Opening Doors" – Franklin, Charley, Mary, Joe and Beth
 "Seventh Transition" – Franklin Shepard Jr., Beth and Mrs. Spencer
 "Our Time" – Franklin, Charley, Mary and Company
 Exit Music – Orchestra

Recordings
The original Broadway cast recorded the show the day after their final performance. The recording was released by RCA as an LP album in April 1982, then compact disc in 1986. A 2007 remastered CD release from Sony/BMG Broadway Masterworks includes a bonus track of Sondheim performing "It's a Hit".

A cast recording of the 2012 Encores! revival was released by PS Classics as a two-CD set, featuring Colin Donnell, Celia Keenan Bolger, Lin-Manuel Miranda, Jessica Vosk, and Elizabeth Stanley.

Various artists have recorded the show's songs, including Carly Simon, Rosemary Clooney, Frank Sinatra, Petula Clark, Mandy Patinkin, Bernadette Peters, Betty Buckley, Cleo Laine, Liza Minnelli, Barbara Cook, Patti LuPone, Barry Manilow, Audra McDonald, Michael Crawford, and Lena Horne. "Not a Day Goes By", "Good Thing Going", "Old Friends", and "Our Time" frequently appear on the cabaret circuit.

Documentary
Original cast member Lonny Price directed a documentary produced by Atlas Media, Best Worst Thing That Ever Could Have Happened, describing the "thrilling, wrenching experience" of the original production. It opened on November 18, 2016, in New York City, followed by a question-and-answer session with Price, moderated by Bernadette Peters.

Film adaptation

In 2019, it was announced that Richard Linklater would film an adaptation of the musical. Like Linklater's 2014 film Boyhood, it will be filmed for more than a decade, allowing the actors to age with their characters. Ben Platt, Paul Mescal, and Beanie Feldstein are attached to play Charley, Frank, and Mary, respectively.

The 2017 film Lady Bird includes a school production of Merrily We Roll Along in its story. One of the students in the production was played by Feldstein.

Awards and nominations

Original Broadway production

1994 Off-Broadway production

Original London production

2012 London production

2013 West End production

References

External links
 Merrily We Roll Along at the Internet Broadway Database
 Merrily We Roll Along on The Stephen Sondheim Reference Guide
 Merrily We Roll Along at Sondheim.com
 Merrily We Roll Along at the Music Theatre International website
 Background information about the musical and the play

1981 musicals
Broadway musicals
Musicals based on plays
Musicals by Stephen Sondheim
Critics' Circle Theatre Award-winning musicals
Laurence Olivier Award-winning musicals
Backstage musicals